George Douglas Stanley (March 19, 1876 – February 22, 1954) was a politician and physician from Alberta, Canada. He began as a pioneer medical doctor in Alberta in 1901.  He served in the Legislative Assembly of Alberta from 1913 to 1921 as a member of the Conservative Party, and he served in the Canadian House of Commons from 1930 to 1935 sitting with the federal Conservatives.

Provincial politics
Stanley ran for a seat to the Alberta legislature in the 1909 general election. He lost by only eight votes to Liberal candidate Louis Roberts. That election result was the closest in the province that year.

Stanley ran again in the 1913 general election. Roberts decided not to defend his seat, and Stanley won by only 58 votes to pick up the seat for the Conservatives.

Stanley ran for a second term in the 1917 general election. He defeated Liberal candidate D.F. Riley by 38 votes.

Stanley retired from the Assembly at dissolution in 1921.

Federal politics
In 1930 he became the Conservative candidate in the federal riding of Calgary East. Stanley defeated incumbent Herbert Adshead in the 1930 federal election.  He was defeated by John Landeryou of the Social Credit Party in the 1935 federal election.

References

External links

 

Members of the House of Commons of Canada from Alberta
Conservative Party of Canada (1867–1942) MPs
Progressive Conservative Association of Alberta MLAs
1876 births
1954 deaths
Physicians from Alberta